Lednevo is a rural locality (a selo) in Nebylovskoye Rural Settlement, Yuryev-Polsky District, Vladimir Oblast, Russia. The population was 39 as of 2010.

Geography 
Lednevo is located 11 km southeast of Yuryev-Polsky (the district's administrative centre) by road. Ryabinki is the nearest rural locality.

References 

Rural localities in Yuryev-Polsky District